Logania albiflora is a shrub found in eastern Australia. Despite being uncommon, it may be found in a variety of different forest and woodland habitats. The genus was named after James Logan. The specific epithet refers to the very fragrant white flowers.

Gallery

References

albiflora
Flora of Queensland
Flora of New South Wales
Flora of Victoria (Australia)
Taxa named by Henry Cranke Andrews